Alex 'Lex' Jacoby (28 February 1930 – 20 November 2015) was a Luxembourgian writer.  He wrote novels, poems, plays and  newspaper articles.  He was born in Junglinster. His early works were written in the French language, Later Jacoby dedicated himself to writing exclusively in German.  Before pursuing writing full-time, Jacoby was a teacher in Clervaux.

Works
 Die Sehnsucht des Schamanen (1952)
 Der Fremde (1954)
 Le Pavot Blanc (1963)
 Luxemburg (1963)
 Der Grenzstein (1963)
 Nachts gehen die Fische an Land (1980)
 Das Logbuch der Arche (1988)
 Der fromme Staub der Feldwege (1990)
 Spanien heiter bis wolkig (1994)
 Wasserzeichen (1995)
 Remis in der Provence (2000)
 Wie nicht ganz schwarzer Kohlenstein (2001)
 Die Deponie (2006)

References

External links
 National Literature Centre profile

Luxembourgian novelists
Luxembourgian poets
Luxembourgian educators
1930 births
2015 deaths
People from Junglinster